Rose's lime juice, often known simply as Rose's, is a sweetened concentrated fruit juice patented in 1867. This was the world's first commercially produced fruit concentrate.

Background
In 1753, James Lind discovered that consuming citrus fruits cured people affected by scurvy, a disease rife throughout the British Navy, whose seamen often went weeks without eating fresh produce.

Limes were preferred to all other citrus fruits, not because of higher vitamin C, but because they were easier to preserve.

From 1795, it became normal practice throughout all long voyages within the Royal Navy, for sailors to receive a daily ration of lemon or lime juice. This quickly gave rise to the nickname "limeys" amongst non-British sailors, which arises in the early 19th century. The preservation of the fruit juice was usually done through the addition of 15% rum.

History 

Lauchlan Rose (1829–1885), a ship chandler in Leith, began a process for preserving lime juice in 1865 and patented this method to preserve citrus juice without alcohol in 1867. He had realised that preserving the juice with sugar rather than alcohol opened the product up to a far wider market.

The first factory producing lime juice was set up as L. Rose & Co. on Commercial Street in Leith, Scotland in 1868. This was located adjacent to the Old East Dock built during the Napoleonic War. This aided both the supply of limes (which do not grow in the UK), and its proximity to what was then Scotland's principal harbour for the Royal Navy. The limes at this time largely came from Dominica in the West Indies. In 1893, Rose purchased plantations there to ensure his supply. This was further supplemented by plantations from Africa from the region now called Ghana.

In 1875, the company had grown so much that it built and moved its headquarters to new premises in London (though still retaining its Leith production). In 1940, during The Blitz, it moved its headquarters from the London docks (a key German target) to St. Albans. After the end of World War II, the company saw its market share in the UK grow. In 1957, Schweppes acquired the company and operated it in the UK until it purchased Mott's in 1982. Cadbury Schweppes merged the operations of the two brands in the United States and Rose's US products became domestically produced.

When Cadbury divested its US beverage operations in 2008, Rose's was transferred to the newly formed Keurig Dr Pepper.

Product

In the United Kingdom, Rose's Lime Juice Cordial is manufactured and distributed by Coca-Cola Enterprises Ltd. In New Zealand, the label states it is made under "the authority" of Schweppes Holdings Ltd by Coca-Cola Amatil (NZ). It also bears the notation that Schweppes Holdings Ltd holds a Royal Warrant to HM Queen Elizabeth II as manufacturers of Schweppes and Rose's soft drinks.

The majority of limes are now sourced from Mexico and Peru. UK and Canadian production remains close to the original recipe, avoiding artificial preservatives and using sugar rather than corn syrup.

The ingredients in the modern US product, listed in order of concentration are water, high fructose corn syrup, lime juice concentrate, sodium metabisulfite (preservative #223), natural flavors, Blue 1. Comparatively, in New Zealand, the list is water, lime juice from concentrate (32%), sugar, food acid 330, and preservative 223 – and when mixed 1:4 (20% concentrate), contains 6.4% fruit juice.

Brands 
Over its history the company added other products 
to its line-up, including a non-alcoholic triple sec, grenadine, and sweet and sour. The company added a line of flavoured martini drink mixers in the early 2000s. In 2006, the company expanded its product line to feature a brand of mojito flavourings.

A licensed brand of lime marmalade is also produced in the United Kingdom, and a lemon cordial is also available in New Zealand. A passion fruit cordial is available in South Africa. 

The current range includes both the original concentrated squash or cordial and also diluted drink mixers.

See also 
 Gimlet (cocktail)
 Lime cordial
 List of juices
 Rose's (marmalade)

References

External links 
 Rose's UK web site

Drink mixers
Keurig Dr Pepper brands
Fruit juice
Products introduced in 1867
Citrus drinks
Limes (fruit)
Scottish drinks
Scottish brands